Port Glasgow Upper was a railway station serving Port Glasgow, Renfrewshire, Scotland, originally as part of the Greenock and Ayrshire Railway.

History

The station was opened on 23 December 1869. On 2 February 1959, stopping passenger services from Glasgow and Paisley ceased running beyond Kilmacolm; however, the  boat trains continued running, without stopping until 30 November 1965.

Later Use Of The Site
Port Glasgow Harelaw telephone exchange, a children's home and a care home for elderly people now stand on the site.

References

Notes

Sources 
 
 
 
 
 
 Approximate location of Port Glasgow Upper station on navigable OS map

Disused railway stations in Inverclyde
Railway stations in Great Britain opened in 1869
Railway stations in Great Britain closed in 1959
1869 establishments in Scotland
Former Glasgow and South Western Railway stations
Port Glasgow